was a Japanese daimyō of the Edo period, who ruled Hiroshima Domain. His childhood name was Sennosuke, later Tamegorō.

Family
 Father: Asano Nagatomo
 Wife: Shunhime, daughter of Asano Nagakane
 Adopted Sons:
 Asano Nagakoto
 Asano Yukitoshi (1861–1936)

He was succeeded by his nephew Asano Nagakoto (1842-1937), son of his brother Asano Toshiteru.

References

1812 births
1872 deaths
Daimyo
Asano clan